Sonny Waaldijk (born June 30, 1990 in Utrecht) is a former Dutch professional basketball player who played for Dutch Basketball League clubs EiffelTowers Den Bosch and Aris Leeuwarden during the 2009-2011 seasons.

References

External links
  eurobasket.com profile

1990 births
Living people
Dutch men's basketball players
Sportspeople from Utrecht (city)
Heroes Den Bosch players
Dutch Basketball League players
Aris Leeuwarden players
Shooting guards